Authenticated Key Exchange (AKE) or Authenticated Key Agreement  is the exchange of session key in a key exchange protocol which also authenticates the identities of parties involved in key exchange.

Transport Layer Security integral to securing HTTP connections is perhaps the most widely deployed AKE protocol.

References

Key management